Radio Television Groupe Avenir (RTG@) is a television network company of the Democratic Republic of the Congo.  It is a member of the Groupe L'Avenir corporate group, along with the daily newspaper L'Avenir.  RTG@'s offices are located in central Kinshasa's district of La Gombe.  The CEO of the group and of the network is Pius Muabilu.  The network was founded in 2003.

Operations
RTG@ TV broadcasts in French and in Lingala.  

RTG@ TV broadcasts on UHF channel 45 in Kinshasa, and throughout Africa on Intelsat 4 satellite television.  The Ivorienne television series Ma Famille is part of RTG@'s schedule.

References
 Radio Television Groupe Avenir article on French Wikipedia

External links
 Groupe Avenir.cd

Companies based in Kinshasa
Mass media companies of the Democratic Republic of the Congo